Robert W. Eaks (born May 22, 1952) is an American professional golfer who played on the PGA Tour and on the Champions Tour.

Eaks was born in Colorado Springs, Colorado. He attended Billy Mitchell High School, where he was a decorated athlete in basketball and golf, and graduated in 1971. His high school home course was Patty Jewett GC where he also worked on the grounds crew. He attended college at the University of Northern Colorado where he played basketball. He turned professional in golf in 1976.

Eaks played mostly on the Nationwide Tour during the regular years portion of his career, where he earned three victories. He was a member of the Nationwide Tour from 1990–1997 and 1999–2001. He was a member of the PGA Tour in 1998 and 1999 but was not very successful. He entered 50 events and only made 17 cuts. His best finish on the PGA Tour was tied for 7th at the United Airlines Hawaiian Open in 1998.

Eaks became eligible to play on the Champions Tour in 2002 and has been a member since then. He had a very successful 2007 season. He won the Dick's Sporting Goods Open in July and the Greater Hickory Classic at Rock Barn in September. He had 11 top-10s including four runners-up. Eaks participated in the largest playoff in a PGA Tour-sanctioned tournament at the Boeing Greater Seattle Classic. Denis Watson emerged victorious from the 7-man playoff. He finished sixth on the 2007 season Champions Tour money list and won the Comeback Player of the Year award.

Professional wins (10)

Nike Tour wins (3)

Nike Tour playoff record (0–1)

Other wins (3)
1990 Arizona Open
1995 Taco Bell Newport Classic
1996 Taco Bell Newport Classic

Champions Tour wins (4)

Champions Tour playoff record (0–3)

Results in major championships

CUT = missed the half-way cut
Note: Eaks only played in the U.S. Open.

See also
Spring 1980 PGA Tour Qualifying School graduates
1997 Nike Tour graduates

References

External links

American male golfers
PGA Tour golfers
PGA Tour Champions golfers
Korn Ferry Tour graduates
Golfers from Colorado
Golfers from Arizona
American men's basketball players
Northern Colorado Bears men's basketball players
Sportspeople from Colorado Springs, Colorado
People from Fountain Hills, Arizona
Sportspeople from the Phoenix metropolitan area
1952 births
Living people